The Merry Wives of Windsor is a 1910 silent short historical comedy based on the play by William Shakespeare directed by Francis Boggs and produced by the Selig Polyscope Company. Two cast members were Kathlyn Williams and Margarita Fischer.

The film is preserved in the Library of Congress.

Cast
Kathlyn Williams - Mistress Ford
Margarita Fischer - Mistress Page

References

External links

1910 short films
American silent short films
American black-and-white films
Selig Polyscope Company films
1910 films
American historical comedy films
1910s historical comedy films
1910 comedy films
1910s American films
Silent American comedy films
1910s English-language films
Silent historical comedy films